The Order pro Merito Melitensi is the order of merit of the Sovereign Military Order of Malta, established in 1920. It is awarded to recipients who have brought honour to the Sovereign Military Order of Malta, promoted Christian values and for charity as defined by the Roman Catholic Church. Unlike Knights or Dames of the Order of Malta (which is a military order of chivalry), those decorated with the Order pro Merito Melitensi are not invested in a religious ceremony, do not swear any oath or make any religious commitment. It  may therefore be bestowed upon non-Catholics. Conferees include prominent statesmen, such as Presidents Ronald Reagan, who received it while still in office, and George H. W. Bush.

The order comprises two ranks (Knight and Dame) and six grades, including Commander, now rare in the Order of Malta, and has no nobiliary grades, thus being comparable to numerous orders of merit around the world, including the Papal orders, France's Order of National Merit and Britain's Order of the British Empire.

Order pro Merito Melitensi

Collar of the Order pro Merito Melitensi 
 Pro Merito Melitensi Collar – Military Class
 Pro Merito Melitensi Collar – Civilian Class
 Single grade, usually bestowed to Heads of State only.

Cross of the Order pro Merito Melitensi

Military Class 
 Grand Cross with Swords pro Merito Melitensi – Special Class
 Grand Cross with Swords pro Merito Melitensi
 Grand Officer Cross with Swords pro Merito Melitensi
 Commander Cross with Swords pro Merito Melitensi
 Officer Cross with Swords pro Merito Melitensi
 Cross with Swords pro Merito Melitensi

Civilian Class 
 Grand Cross pro Merito Melitensi – Special Class
 Grand Cross pro Merito Melitensi
 Grand Officer Cross pro Merito Melitensi
 Commander Cross pro Merito Melitensi
 Officer Cross pro Merito Melitensi
 Cross pro Merito Melitensi

Ecclesiastics Class 
 Grand Cross pro Piis Meritis Melitensi
 Cross pro Piis Meritis Melitensi

Medal of the Order pro Merito Melitensi

Old style (1920–1960) 
 Gold Medal pro Merito Melitensi
 Silver Medal pro Merito Melitensi
 Bronze Medal pro Merito Melitensi

Military Class 
 Gold Medal with Swords pro Merito Melitensi
 Silver Medal with Swords pro Merito Melitensi
 Bronze Medal with Swords pro Merito Melitensi

Civilian Class 
 Gold Medal pro Merito Melitensi
 Silver Medal pro Merito Melitensi
 Bronze Medal pro Merito Melitensi

The Order pro Merito Melitensi

Classes of the Order pro Merito Melitensi
The Order pro Merito Melitensi comprises the following classes:
Collar
Cross
Medal

The Collar pro Merito Melitensi
The Collar only has a single grade, but is separated into two divisions, namely "Collar pro Merito Melitensi" for Civilians and "Collar with Swords pro Merito Melitensi" for the Military. The Collar is only awarded to Heads of State.

The Cross pro Merito Melitensi
The Cross is bestowed upon both civilians and military personnel, comprising several grades:
 Knight or Dame Grand Cross pro Merito Melitensi – Special Class
 Knight or Dame Grand Cross pro Merito Melitensi
 Knight or Dame Grand Officer pro Merito Melitensi (with Badge for women)
 Knight (or Dame) Commander pro Merito Melitensi (with Crown for women)
 Knight or Dame Officer pro Merito Melitensi (with Coat of arms for women)
 Cross (Knight or Dame) pro Merito Melitensi

N.B: these decorations are "with Swords" for serving military and "without Swords" for civilians.

The Cross "pro piis meritis" pro Merito Melitensi
When awarded to ecclesiastics, it has the same cross as awarded to civilians and military personnel. Nevertheless, this ribbon is black crossed with two thin red lines and comprises only two grades :
 Grand Cross "pro piis meritis" pro Merito Melitensi,
 Cross "pro piis meritis" pro Merito Melitensi.

The Medal pro Merito Melitensi
This class has three grades: Gold, Silver and Bronze.

Ribbons
There are only three different types of ribbons for both the medal and the crosses.

See also
 Sovereign Military Order of Malta

Further reading
Orders of Knighthood, Awards and the Holy See, by H.E. Cardinale and Peter Bander-van Duren, 3rd ed. 1985

External links 

 Official Website
 Sovereign Military Order of Malta in the United Kingdom - Order pro Merito Melitensi
 Two examples for the ribbons of the Order pro merito Melitensi

Awards established in 1920
1920 establishments in Italy
Orders of merit
Orders, decorations, and medals of the Sovereign Military Order of Malta